Ilansky is a town and the administrative center of Ilansky District of Krasnoyarsk Krai, Russia, located on the Ilanka River  east of Krasnoyarsk. Population:

History
It was founded in 1645 as the village of Ilanskaya. Town status was granted to it in 1939.

Administrative and municipal status
Within the framework of administrative divisions, Ilansky serves as the administrative center of Ilansky District. As an administrative division, it is, together with the village of Algasy, incorporated within Ilansky District as the district town of Ilansky. As a municipal division, the district town of Ilansky is incorporated within Ilansky Municipal District as Ilansky Urban Settlement.

In popular culture

Prominently featured as a time rift location at alternative history sci-fi Kirov novel series

References

Notes

Sources

External links

Official website of Ilansky 
Ilansky Business Directory 

Cities and towns in Krasnoyarsk Krai
1645 establishments in Russia